Shhh is a 1975 American comedy film directed by Paul B. Price and starring Rita Moreno and Robert Sacchi. The film was released in the United States on October 10, 1975, by United Artists.

Plot
Seven short films, including the prize-winning Skaterdater, are packaged in this feature-length omnibus, with a framing device depicting a man and woman on a first date watching the shorts in a theatre.

Cast 
Rita Moreno
Robert Sacchi

See also
 List of American films of 1975

References

External links 
 

1975 films
United Artists films
American comedy films
1975 comedy films
1970s English-language films
1970s American films